István Rusznyák (Budapest, 22 January 1889 – Budapest, 15 October 1974), was a Hungarian physician. He was the President of the Hungarian Academy of Sciences between 1949 and 1970.

Biography

Rusznyák came from a family of Jewish intellectuals. In 1911 he got a diploma in medicine from the Budapest University of Medical Sciences. He worked in the Pathology Department. He fought in the First World War. In 1926, private professor lecturers, he worked as a lecturer on.

Between 1931 and 1944 he was the director of the Department of Medicine i Medical Faculty of University of Szeged. In 1937/38 school year he was elected dean. With start of Second World War, in 1944, he and his family were deported but was returned from Austria.( eyewitness) After the end of the Second World War, he worked as the Head of the Department of Internal Medicine. In 1946, he was elected a full member of the Hungarian Academy of Sciences and was elected its president in 1949. In 1963, he retired as a university professor but he continued as the President of the Hungarian Academy of Sciences until 1970. He remained an academic advisor from 1971 until his death in 1974.

Contributions
Along with Albert Szent-Györgyi he discovered Vitamin P and proved that chemically it belongs to the flavones.

References

1889 births
1974 deaths
People from Budapest
People from the Kingdom of Hungary
Hungarian Jews
Members of the Hungarian Socialist Workers' Party
Members of the National Assembly of Hungary (1945–1947)
Members of the National Assembly of Hungary (1949–1953)
Members of the National Assembly of Hungary (1953–1958)
Members of the National Assembly of Hungary (1958–1963)
Members of the National Assembly of Hungary (1963–1967)
Hungarian pathologists
Vitamin researchers
Members of the Hungarian Academy of Sciences
Foreign Members of the USSR Academy of Sciences
Recipients of the Lomonosov Gold Medal